Khnusik() is a village in the Ashtarak Municipality of the Aragatsotn Province of Armenia. It has hot summers and a humid continental climate.

References

Populated places in Aragatsotn Province